Kickapoo was a small town (now extinct) in Warren Township, Warren County, in the U.S. state of Indiana.

History
Platted by Lewis Davisson on February 2, 1885, the town was served by the newly-constructed Chicago and Great Southern Railway.  The town never grew substantially and is described in a 1913 history as having "a small population".

Geography
Kickapoo was located at or near  in section 29, township 22, range 7 west, along what is now Kickapoo Road (County Road 425 E).  Kickapoo Creek flows past the site and meets the Wabash River about a mile to the south.

References

Former populated places in Warren County, Indiana
Populated places established in 1885
Ghost towns in Indiana
1885 establishments in Indiana